Celestino Midali (born 18 January 1957) is an Italian biathlete. He competed in the relay event at the 1980 Winter Olympics.

References

External links
 

1957 births
Living people
Italian male biathletes
Olympic biathletes of China
Biathletes at the 1980 Winter Olympics
Sportspeople from the Province of Bergamo